This is a list of political parties in Latvia. Latvia has a multi-party system, where no one party often has a chance of gaining power alone, and parties must work with each other to form coalition governments.

The parties

Major parties

Parties represented in the Saeima or the European Parliament.

Minor and regional parties 

For Each and Every One (Katram un katrai, KuK)
Republic (Republika, R)  
Action Party (Rīcības partija)
Awakening (Atmoda)
Awakening for Latvia (Atmoda Latvijai, formerly For Latvia from the Heart, NSL)
Christian Democratic Union (Kristīgi Demokrātiskā Savienība, KDS)
Centre Party (Centra partija)
United for Latvia (Vienoti Latvijai, VL)
For a Humane Latvia (Par cilvēcīgu Latviju, PCL)
For Latvia and Ventspils (Latvijai un Ventspilij, LuV) – nationally allied with the Union of Greens and Farmers
Force of People's Power (Tautas Varas Spēks, TVS)
The Conservatives (Konservatīvie, K)
Growth (Izaugsme) – part of Development/For!
 (Tēvzemes mantojums, TM)
Honor to serve Riga (Gods kalpot Rīgai, GKR)
National Power Unity (Nacionālā Savienība Taisnīgums, NST)
Latgale Party (Latgales partija) – in Latgale; allied with Unity within the New Unity alliance
People's Servants for Latvia (Tautas kalpi Latvijai, TKL)
Progressive Christian Party (Kristīgi Progresīvā partija, KPP)
Latvian Social Democratic Labour Party (Latvijas Sociāldemokrātiskā Strādnieku Partija, LSDSP), part of Union of Greens and Farmers
Pirate Party (Pirātu Partija, PP)
Socialist Party of Latvia (Latvijas Sociālistiskā partija, LSP)
Sovereign Power (Suverēnā vara, SV)

Defunct parties and alliances
People's Party (Tautas Partija, TP)
All For Latvia! (Visu Latvijai!, VL) (2006-2011)
New Era Party (Jaunais Laiks, JL)
Civic Union (Pilsoniskā Savienība, PS)
Communist Party of Latvia (Latvijas Komunistiskā Partija, LKP) – banned in 1991
Democratic Center Party (Demokrātiskā Centra Partija, DCP)
Daugavpils City Party (Daugavpils Pilsētas Partija, DPP)
Democratic Party "Saimnieks" (Demokrātiskā Partija "Saimnieks", DPS)
Equal Rights (Līdztiesība)
For Fatherland and Freedom/LNNK (Tēvzemei un Brīvībai/LNNK, TB/LNNK) 
For the Native Language! (Par Dzimto Valodu!)
Free Choice in a People's Europe (Brīvā izvēle tautu Eiropā, BITE)
Workers' Party (Darba Partija, DP)
Honor to Serve Our Latvia (Gods kalpot mūsu Latvijai, GKML)
Latvian Social Democratic Party (Latvijas Sociāldemokrātiskā Partija, LSDP)
Latvian National Independence Movement (Latvijas Nacionālās Neatkarības Kustība, LNNK)
Latvian Nationalists (Latviešu Nacionālisti)
Latvia's First Party (Latvijas Pirmā Partija, LPP)
Latvian Way (Latvijas Ceļš)
National Harmony Party (Tautas Saskaņas Partija, TSP)
New Centre (Jaunais Centrs, JC)
New Party (Jaunā Partija, JP)
Our Land (Mūsu Zeme)
People of Latgale (Latgales Tauta, LT)
Popular Front of Latvia (Latvijas Tautas Fronte, LTF)
Popular Movement for Latvia (Tautas Kustība Latvijai, TKL)
Social Democratic Party (Sociāldemokrātiskā partija, SDS)
Socialist Workers and Peasants Party of Latvia (Latvijas Sociālistiskā Strādnieku un Zemnieku Partija)
Society for Political Change (Sabiedrība Citai Politikai, SCP)
Reform Party (Reformu partija, RP) (2011-2015)
Anti-Centrist Party

See also
 Liberalism in Latvia
 Politics of Latvia
 List of political parties by country

References

External links 

 List of political parties and alliances (Register of Enterprises of the Republic of Latvia)/

Latvia
 
Political parties
Political parties
Latvia

he:פוליטיקה של לטביה#הסאימה